William Joseph Stack (30 September 1936 – 7 August 2013) was a British boxer. He competed in the men's middleweight event at the 1964 Summer Olympics and fought as Willie Stack. At the 1964 Summer Olympics, he lost in his first fight to Emil Schulz of the United Team of Germany.

Stack won the 1964 Amateur Boxing Association British middleweight title, when boxing out of the Leamington Boys Club.

References

External links
 

1936 births
2013 deaths
British male boxers
Olympic boxers of Great Britain
Boxers at the 1964 Summer Olympics
Sportspeople from Leamington Spa
Middleweight boxers